Abiha Haider (born 23 February 1996) is a Pakistani footballer who plays as a midfielder for Balochistan United and the Pakistan women's national football team. She was also the captain of Pakistan's Australian Football League team which competed in the 2017 Australian Football International Cup.

In 2020, she was featured in the list of 30 Most Powerful Muslim Women in Sports. She is also a part of Pakistan's National Youth Council.

Football career

Domestic career 
At the age of 12, Abiha represented Islamabad at the 2008 National Women Football Championship. In the 2010 National Women Football Championship, she scored two goals in a 4-3 comeback win in the final group stage match against Diya which helped her team top its group and progress to the quarterfinals. She represented Islamabad at six National Championships till 2013, scoring 41 goals in 36 appearances.

Abiha moved to Balochistan United in 2014 At the 10th National Women Football Championship, she scored three goals as her new team went on to win their maiden national title.

In 2021, Abiha joined Highlanders, and represented them at the 13th National Women Football Championship. In the first group match, she scored twice in a 16-0 win over Nawanshehr United.

International career 
Abiha was the youngest player to represent Pakistan when, at the age of 13, she took part in the football event at the 2010 South Asian Games in Dhaka. She subsequently represent Pakistan at the 2010, 2012, and the 2014 SAFF Women's Championships. She was also part of the squad that visited Bahrain for a three-match friendly series against Bahrain women's national football team.

In 2019, Abiha was part of two Guinness World Records entries when she participated in a football match that lasted 69 hours during the 2019 FIFA Women’s World Cup in France. The event took place in Lyon and involved 807 players from 53 countries.

Personal life 
Abiha's father, Masood Haider, was a footballer who played at Punjab level, while her mother, Zara, was a former hockey player as well as a television newscaster. Abiha has a LLB (Hons) and an LL.M. degree from the University of London.

Honours

Balochistan United 

 National Women Football Championship: 2014

Individual 

 30 Most Powerful Muslim Women in Sports
 25 under 25 Extraordinary Young Women of Pakistan
 Guinness World Records: Most nationalities in a football (soccer) exhibition match

References

1996 births
Living people
Pakistani women's footballers
Place of birth missing (living people)
Women's association football midfielders
Pakistan women's international footballers